The Iscayachi Formation, in older literature also referred to as Guanacuno Formation, is an extensive Tremadocian geologic formation of western and southern Bolivia. The shales and sandstones were deposited in a shallow marine to pro-delta environment.

Fossil content 
The formation has provided the following fossils:

 Akoldinoidia sinuosa
 Altiplanelaspis palquiensis
 Angelina hyeronimi, A. punctalineata
 Asaphellus communis, A. riojanas
 Deltacare prosops
 Conophrys erquensis
 Golasaphus palquiensis
 Jujuyaspis keideli
 Kainella andina, K. meridionalis
 Kvania lariensis
 Leptoplastides mariana
 Macrocystella bavarica
 Micragnostus hoeki
 Onychopyge branisai
 Parabolinella argentinensis, P. boliviana
 Pharostomina alvarezi, P. trapezoidalis
 Rhabdinopora flabelliformis
 Rhadinopleura incaica
 Rossaspis rossi
 Saltaspis steinmanni
 Shumardia erquensis
 Leptoplastides cf. granulosa
 Altiplanelaspis sp.
 Araiopleura sp.
 Broeggeria sp.
 Ctenodonta sp.
 Dictyonema sp.
 Koldinioidia sp.
 Leiostegium sp.
 Nanorthis sp.
 Onychopyge sp.
 Palquiella sp.
 Parabolina sp.
 Saltaspis sp.
 Sphaerocare sp.
 Trilobitarum sp.
 Tropidodiscus sp.

See also 
 List of fossiliferous stratigraphic units in Bolivia

References

Bibliography

Further reading 
 J. L. Benedetto. 2007. New Upper Cambrian-Tremadoc rhynchonelliformean brachiopods from northwestern Argentina: evolutionary trends and early diversification of plectorthoideans in the Andean Gondwana. Journal of Paleontology 81(2):261-285
 A. Pribyl and J. Vanek. 1980. Ordovician trilobites of Bolivia. Rozpravy Ceskoslovenske Akademie Ved. Rada Matematickych a Prirodnich Ved. Academia Praha, Prague, Czechoslovakia 90(2):1-90
 R. Suárez Soruco. 1976. El sistema ordovícico en Bolivia. Revista Tecnica YPF Bolivia 5(2):111-123

Geologic formations of Bolivia
Ordovician System of South America
Ordovician Bolivia
Tremadocian
Shale formations
Sandstone formations
Shallow marine deposits
Deltaic deposits
Ordovician southern paleotemperate deposits
Paleontology in Bolivia
Formations
Formations